South Salt is a barony  in County Kildare, Republic of Ireland.

Etymology
South Salt derives its name from the Latin name of Leixlip: Saltus salmonis (literally "salmon leap"; the English name is derived from Old Norse Lax-hlaup). This makes Salt one of very few Irish placenames derived directly from Latin.

Location

South Salt barony is located in northeast County Kildare, south of the Liffey, bordering on County Dublin.

History

There was originally a single Salt barony, divided into south and north baronies before 1807.

List of settlements

Below is a list of settlements in South Salt:
Ardclough
Kill
Kilteel

References

Baronies of County Kildare